Mapleton Avenue is a light rail station in Australia on the Canberra Metro R1 Civic to Gungahlin line, located at the intersection of Mapleton Avenue, Flemington Road and Manning Clark Crescent. The station serves the suburbs of Franklin and Harrison and provides bicycle racks for commuters in addition to  "kiss and ride" bays, installed around the intersection adjacent to the station.

Light rail services
All services in both directions stop at the station. Although the station is not a major interchange, transfers to local ACTION bus route 18 are also available.

References

Light rail stations in Canberra
Railway stations in Australia opened in 2019